Wagenya is the name of a place in the Democratic Republic of the Congo and of the people living there; situated in the northern part of Congo, by the city of Kisangani and on the lower reaches of the Boyoma Falls. As a result, the seventh and last cataract on the Boyoma is named the Wagenia Falls.

Because of low rock banks, at this point the Congo River is not anymore navigable and it creates rapids.
For centuries, people living there have fished in a rather interesting way.  They build a huge system of wooden tripods across the river.  These tripods are anchored on the holes naturally carved in the rock by the water current.  To these tripods are anchored large baskets, which are lowered in the rapids to "sieve" the waters for fish.
It is a very selective fishing method, as these baskets are quite big and only large fish are entrapped.
Twice a day the adult Wagenya people pull out these baskets to check if there is any fish caught; in which case somebody will dive into the river to fetch it.
At the end of each day the product of this ancient way of fishing is divided among all the members of the same family; including also those who did not take direct action into it.
The locations where each individual can set his baskets are inherited like for a property of land.

Fishing in the Democratic Republic of the Congo
Geography of the Democratic Republic of the Congo
Fishing techniques and methods
places